Mayoux is a village in Valais, Switzerland.

See also
Anniviers
Saint-Luc
Vissoie

References

Villages in Valais